Garhmukteshwar is a town, just outside of Hapur city, and tehsil in Hapur district of Uttar Pradesh, India. According to Census 2011 information the sub-district code of Garhmukteshwar block is 00741. Total area of Garhmukteshwar is 272 km2 including 237.38 km2 rural area and 34.13 km2 urban area. Garhmukteshwar has a population of 46,077. There are 64,688 houses in the sub-district. There are about 137 villages in Garhmukteshwar block.

History
Garhmukteshwar is an ancient place that is mentioned in the Bhagavata Purana and the Mahabharata. There are claims that it was a part of ancient Hastinapur, the capital of the Pandavas. An ancient fort, repaired by the Maratha leader Mir Bhawan, became, under the British, the headquarters of the tehsil. The name of the town is derived from the temple of Mukteshwar Mahadeva, dedicated to the goddess Ganga who is worshipped there in four temples. The town has 80 sati pillars, marking the spots where Hindu widows are said to have become Sati-Mata. The town also has a mosque, built by Gays-ud-din Balban, that bears an inscription in Arabic dating to 682 Hijri (1283 A.D.).

Partition violence
Garhmukteshwar was the scene of major anti-Muslim violence in November 1946, at a time when various areas of British India were experiencing significant communal unrest as the partition of the country into India and Pakistan loomed. Gyanendra Pandey describes the place as "a metaphor for the atrocities of Partition; and Partition itself a metaphor for the kind of extraordinary genocidal violence that was not witnessed again in India, perhaps until 1984". A mela (fair) held  from the town was attended by between 700,000 - 800,000 people and on 6 November 1946 there were a series of attacks on Muslim shopkeepers at the event, resulting in 46 deaths and a further 39 people injured. The assaults and also arson attacks continued on and off for several days at the mela, while the town of Garhmukteshwar itself witnessed a large number of anti-Muslim atrocities, including killings, arson and the destruction of the Muslim quarter. Official reports gave the Muslim death toll in the town as at least 214 people, and there were also quite a lot Hindu deaths in retaliatory attacks.

Official investigations into violence in Uttar Pradesh at that time note that there was a "desire for revenge" among both Hindus and Muslims, resulting from news of similar violence in Calcutta.

Climate

Garhmukteshwar has a monsoon influenced humid subtropical climate characterized by very hot summers and cool winters. Summers last from early April to late June during and are extremely hot, with temperatures reaching . The monsoon arrives in late June and continues till the middle of September. Temperatures drop slightly, with plenty of cloud cover but with higher humidity.
Rainfall is about 80 cm to 100 cm per annum, which is suitable for growing crops. Most of the rainfall is received during the monsoon. Humidity varies from 30 to 100%. The town receives no snow.

Demographics
Garhmukhteshwar has a population of 46,077 of which 24,437 are males and 21,640 are females, per the 2011 Census of India.

Location

Railways
There are two railway stations in the city, named Garhmukteshwar and Garhmukteshwar Bridge (Brijghat). Both stations are situated on the Delhi–Moradabad line.

See also
 Ghaziabad, Uttar Pradesh
 Siyana
 Bulandshahr
 Gajraula
 Amroha
 Hapur

References

Cities and towns in Hapur district
Mass murder in 1946